Colonial Cup may refer to:
 Colonial Cup (ice hockey), the trophy for the post-season champion of the International Hockey League. 
 Colonial Cup (rugby league), an international rugby league football challenge match played between the United States national rugby league team and the Canada Wolverines.
 Colonial Cup (rugby union), the second highest level of competition within Fijian rugby union.  
 A horse race in Camden, South Carolina